Calliphara is a genus of insect in the family Scutelleridae (Hemiptera).

This genus has a wide distribution extending to China, Philippines, Queensland and New Guinea.

Selected species
 Calliphara bifasciata (White, 1842)
 Calliphara nobilis (Linnaeus, 1763)
 Calliphara regalis (Fabricius, 1775)

References

 F.J.D. McDoNALD A Comparative study of the Male Genitalia of Queensland Scutellerinae Leach (Hemiptera: Pentatomidae)

Scutelleridae
Pentatomomorpha genera
Hemiptera of Asia
Taxa named by Ernst Friedrich Germar